St. Luke's College of Nursing or SLCN (formerly, St. Luke's Hospital School of Nursing) is one of the educational units of Trinity University of Asia. It started operating under Trinity College of Quezon City in 1965 when its first class was admitted. The decision to establish the College of Nursing, however, was made as early as March 13, 1964 when at a meeting of the St. Luke's Hospital School of Nursing Board of Trustees, it was decided that steps be taken by the school to become a collegiate program. By that time, the former Capitol City College has already been bought by the Bishop of the Philippines, Philippine Episcopal Church, as Corporate Sole and renamed Trinity College of Quezon City.

The aim of the school is "Producing competent and world class nurses".

The St. Luke’s Hospital School of Nursing, the predecessor of St. Luke's College of Nursing, is one of the oldest nursing schools in the Philippines. It was established in 1907 soon after the founding of St. Luke’s Hospital (now the St. Luke's Medical Center). The Rev. Charles Brent, the first Bishop of the Episcopal Church in the Philippines saw the need for Filipino nurse initiated the school’s establishment together with Miss Ellen T. Hicks, then the first superintendent of nurses. The school had three of the seventeen Filipino women who first took nursing in the Philippines.

Since 1911, St. Luke’s graduates have distinguished themselves in clinical practice, nursing education, government service, and postgraduate studies through the promotion and advancement of nursing in the Philippines.

The school celebrated its centenary in 2007, St. Luke’s College of Nursing has prided itself through the 100 years as one of the oldest and one of the top performing nursing schools in the Philippines.

Courses Offered:
Doctor in Nursing Management
Master of Arts in Nursing
Bachelor of Science in Nursing

Notable alumni
Vitaliana G. Beltran, R.N. (Class 1917) - First Filipina Superintendent of Nurses who served St. Luke's Hospital for more than forty years.  She also pioneered the organization of the Filipino Nurses Association in 1922 now known as the Philippine Nurses' Association (PNA).
Leah Primitiva Goco Samaco-Paquiz, Ed.D., R.N. (Class 1973) - National President of the Philippine Nurses Association (2007)
Ruth Raña-Padilla, R.N. (Class 1975) - 2007 Commissioner of the Professional Regulation Commission, Philippine Nurses Association Governor for Region II.
Maria Angelica Rosedell Amante, R.N. (Class 1991) - Governor (1995–2004) and Congressional Representative (2004–2007) of Agusan del Norte, Philippines.
Maria Kristelle M. Lazaro, R.N. (Class 2007) - Miss Philippines-Earth Fire 2008 winner.

Principals / Deans of St. Luke's Hospital School of Nursing and Trinity University of Asia - St. Luke's College of Nursing
Ellen Hicks (1907–1917)
Deaconess Charlotte Massey (1917–1921)
Eliza Davis (1921–1923)
Lillian Weiser (1923–1941)
Vitaliana G. Beltran (1941–1945)
Emelda Tinawin Jones (1945–1946)
Asuncion Parrenas Koenig (1946–1949)
Mary Vita Beltran Jackson (1949–1953)
Herminia Reyes (1953–1954)
Ester Abellera Santos (1954–1962)
Josefina Cortez Carreon (1962–1966)
Ester Abellera Santos (1966–1985)
Fe E. Alcantara (1985–1994)
Leah Primitiva G. Samaco-Paquiz (1994–2003)
Ester Lopez Dimanlig (2003–2005)
Gisela de Asas Luna (2005–2017)
John Michael Olea Lorena (present)

External links

Official websites
TUA - Trinity University of Asia's official website
 SLANF - St. Luke's Alumni Nursing Foundation, USA
 SLCN MULTIPLY SITE - SLCN's Multiply site

Nursing schools in the Philippines
Educational institutions established in 1965
1965 establishments in the Philippines